The Soviet Union's 1961 nuclear test series was a group of 57 nuclear tests conducted in 1961. These tests followed the 1958 Soviet nuclear tests series and preceded the Soviet Project K nuclear tests series.

Notes

References

1961
1961 in the Soviet Union
1961 in military history
Explosions in 1961